Mogoș is a commune located in Alba County, Transylvania, Romania. It has a population of 731 (2011). It is composed of 21 villages: Bărbești, Bârlești (Mogosbirlesty), Bârlești-Cătun, Bârzogani, Bocești, Bogdănești, Butești, Cojocani (Mogoskozsokány), Cristești, Mămăligani (Mamaligány), Mogoș, Negrești, Oncești, Poienile-Mogoș, Tomești, Valea Bârluțești, Valea Barnii (Valeabarni), Valea Cocești, Valea Giogești (Gyogyel), Valea Mlacii, and Valea Țupilor.

It is traversed by county roads DJ107K, which connects to national road DN1 in Galda de Jos, and DJ107I, which connects to  near Abrud.

References

Communes in Alba County
Localities in Transylvania